Defending champions Diede de Groot and Aniek van Koot defeated Yui Kamiji and Kgothatso Montjane in the final, 6–2, 6–2 to win the women's doubles wheelchair tennis title at the 2022 US Open.

Seeds

Draw

Finals

References

External links 
 Draw

Wheelchair Women's Doubles
U.S. Open, 2022 Women's Doubles